Cebolada is a Portuguese onion stew, onion sauce or paste that is prepared with onion as a primary ingredient. Versions prepared as a paste may be slow-cooked.

Dishes with cebolada
It may accompany various dishes, such as seafood dishes prepared with swordfish steak. Atum de cebolada is a dish prepared with tuna steak and cebolada that is prepared with caramelized onions.

Cebolada is used on beef dishes such as bifes de cebolada (also referred to as bife de cebolada), which uses thinly-sliced steak and cebolada. Additional ingredients in the dish's preparation include white wine, vinegar and butter. Bifes de cebolada is a frequent menu item in Portuguese restaurants, and traditionally it is served with Portuguese fried potatoes.

See also

 List of onion dishes
 List of Portuguese dishes
 List of vegetable dishes

References

Portuguese cuisine
Onion-based foods